Poly [ADP-ribose] polymerase 8 is an enzyme that in humans is encoded by the PARP8 gene.

References

Further reading